Juan Carlos Monedero Fernández-Gala (born 12 January 1963) is a Spanish political scientist and writer. He is a professor at the Complutense University of Madrid and a host of La Tuerka. He was one of the leading members of Podemos until he resigned in April 2015.

Academic career 
Monedero studied economics, achieving a degree in political science and sociology in the Universidad Complutense de Madrid (UCM). He did his doctorate studies in the Heidelberg University (Germany) between 1989 and 1992, under the direction of political scientist Klaus von Beyme. His doctoral thesis, Causas de la disolución de la República Democrática Alemana. La ausencia de legitimidad: 1949-1989, was read in the UCM in 1996, with the qualification Apto Cum Laude.

Monedero has been a professor of political science at the UCM since 1992. He does research and teaches subjects related to political institutions, state theory, South America, and the Spanish political system. He has been an invited professor in various universities in Europe (London and Berlin) and South America (Argentina, Mexico, Colombia, Venezuela).

Political consultant and analysis 

Juan Carlos Monedero was a political advisor to Spanish politician Gaspar Llamazares from 2000 to 2005, when he was the General Coordinator of United Left. Monedero was also a consultant to the Venezuelan government led by Hugo Chávez between 2005 and 2010.

Media
Monedero has done media work in both print and television. He has published columns in newspapers such as Público, written articles in El País, and collaborated in political debate programmes such as La Tuerka and Fort Apache, presented by Pablo Iglesias. Monedero currently works with the newspaper La Marea, in CuartoPoder, and maintains a personal blog.

Monedero appeared in the 2001 comedy film Gente pez and the 2013 choral film Gente en sitios.

Academic and political practice 

Juan Carlos Monedero has critically defended the Bolivarian Revolution. He called Hugo Chávez "the last liberator of South America", and argued that the political process in South America is a positive example for a world immersed in a "systematic capitalist crisis". 

Monedero is close to the 15-M movement, and some media outlets have classified him as its "ideological leader", although he says that nobody can hold such a position. Monedero's opinion about 15-M is that "it is the best thing that has happened to the democracy".

In January 2014, Monedero participated in the Podemos project with other activists and intellectuals such as Pablo Iglesias, seeking to unite left-wing forces in Spain against the current European political and financial system.

Funds
According to El Mundo, Monedero supposedly received up to €1.5 million from the Venezuelan Foundation of the Center for Political and Social Studies. This has caused controversy, with allegations that Monedero's tax records may have not included the alleged payments. In 2015 the Spanish Socialist Party (PSOE) demanded more details about the alleged payments from Venezuela to Monedero.

The veracity of these claims and the political motives of those making and publishing them has been questioned.

Books

References

External links 
Personal website

 

1963 births
Living people
Podemos (Spanish political party) politicians
People from Madrid
Spanish political scientists
Academic staff of the Complutense University of Madrid
Complutense University of Madrid alumni